Ball of the thumb may refer to:

 Thenar eminence, most fleshy portion of the palm of the human hand, located adjacent to the second joint of the thumb
 Thumb pulp fleshy portion opposite the nail, of the first segment (distal phalanx) of the human thumb